The Hassles were a rock group in the 1960s, most notable for recording the first releases to feature Billy Joel. The group released two full-length albums (United Artists Records) and a number of singles.

History
The original line-up of the group consisted of vocalist John Dizek (September 25, 1948 – June 27, 2017), guitarist Richard McKenna, drummer Jon Small, and organist Harry Weber. In 1966 Weber was fired from the band due to excessive drug use (found dead a few years later on a railroad track) and was replaced by Howie Arthur Blauvelt and Billy Joel on bass and keyboards respectively. It is with this lineup that the band recorded their self-titled debut album in 1967. Blauvelt departed the band early in 1968 but returned later on in the year. Dizek departed the band in late 1968, at which point Joel took over on vocals. The band released their second album, Hour of the Wolf, in 1969, before disbanding. Following the demise of The Hassles, Joel and Small formed the duo Attila, whilst Blauvelt later co-founded Ram Jam. Joel later went on to a successful solo career, and Small became a video producer and director.

John Dizek died on June 27, 2017 after a long illness, at age 68.

Members
Richard McKenna - guitars (1964-1969)
Jon Small - drums (1964-1969)
John Dizek - vocals, harmonica, tambourine (1964-1968; died 2017)
Harry Weber - bass, organ (1964-1966)
Billy Joel - keyboards, vocals (1966-1969)
Howie Arthur Blauvelt - bass (1966-1968, 1968-1969; died 1993)
Glenn Evans, John Abrant, and Mike Cohen - road managers

Discography

Albums

The Hassles
Produced by Tony Michaels and Vinnie Gorman, The Hassles' eponymous debut album was released on November 21, 1967 and featured a number of cover versions of soul songs.  The single "You've Got Me Hummin'" was number 112 for one week on the Bubbling Under the Hot 100 chart, their only Billboard chart appearance. In 1983, Billy Joel released a solo live recording of "You Got Me Hummin'" as a B-side to his hit "Tell Her About It" (available on the 12" maxi single, with the 'special remixed version' of the A-side).

Track listing
"Warming Up" (William Joel) - 1:38
"Just Holding On" (Larry Weiss) - 2:06
"A Taste of Honey" (Ric Marlow, Bobby Scott) - 4:17
"Every Step I Take (Every Move I Make)" (William Joel, Tony Michaels, Vinny Gormann)  - 2:30
"Coloured Rain" (Stevie Winwood, Jim Capaldi, Chris Wood) (originally by Traffic) - 3:22
"I Hear Voices" (Gene Boris Stashuk) - 2:53
"I Can Tell" (William Joel) - 2:57
"Giving Up (Version #2)" (Van McCoy) - 4:16
"Fever" (John Davenport, Eddie Cooley) - 3:19
"You've Got Me Hummin'" (Isaac Hayes, David Porter) - 2:27

1992 Re-issued CD with following Bonus Tracks
"I'm Thinkin'" - 2:05
"I'll Be Around" - 2:01
"When I Get Home" - 4:23
"It's Not Enough" - 2:46
"Love Luck" - 3:21
"Look And You Will Find" - 2:58
"Blow My Mind" - 2:14
"Giving Up (Version #1)" - 4:08

Hour of the Wolf
Produced by Thomas Kay, the Hassles' second album was released on January 23, 1969.
All songs on this album were original recordings written by Billy Joel, except where noted.

Track listing
"Country Boy" (W. Joel, J. Small) 2:35
"Night After Day" - 3:11
"Hour Of The Wolf" (W. Joel, J. Dizek) - 11:58
"Four O'Clock In The Morning" - 3:12
"Cat" - 4:15
"Hotel St. George" - 5:00
"Land Of Despair" (W. Joel, J. Small) - 3:36
"Further Than Heaven" (W. Joel, J. Dizek) - 7:16

Singles
Single "Great Balls of Fire" (B-side "Travellin' Band') United Artists label (1969)

Compilations
 In 1992, the first album was released on CD, with a number of bonus tracks. Plans were also made to reissue Hour of the Wolf on CD with bonus tracks, though it remains unreleased.
 In 1999, Razor & Tie re-released the Hassles' two albums as a "best of" collection on a single Compact Disc with "Hotel St. George" missing, but also with additional bonus tracks
 In 2000, a low quality re-release of Hour of the Wolf was released along with all tracks on Cold Spring Harbor as Billy Joel Sings
 In 2004, the same Hour of the Wolf tracks from Billy Joel Sings were released separately as Billy Joel: The Early Years.

References

Rock music groups from New York (state)
Billy Joel